Cristian Benenati (born 15 July 1982 in Vittoria, Sicily) is an Italian former professional road cyclist.

References

External links

1982 births
Living people
Italian male cyclists
People from Vittoria, Sicily
Sportspeople from the Province of Ragusa
Cyclists from Sicily